Bergaios or Bergaeus, 400 – 350 BC, was a Thracian king in the Pangaian region. He is known mainly from the several types of coins that he struck, which resemble those of Thasos. Bergaios could mean literally, 'a man from Berge but the legend on the coin is a personal, not a place name.

Coins of Bergaios

See also
 Pistiros
 Thracians
 Antiphanes of Berge

Notes

External links
 Ancient Coinage of Thracian Kingdom

Thracian kings
Coins of ancient Greece
4th-century BC rulers
Ancient Macedonia